Na Kyung-won (나경원, born 6 December 1963) is a South Korean judge-turned-politician. She is a member of the conservative People Power Party, which is the main opposition party. She was a four-term member of the National Assembly and the first female floor leader of the Liberty Korea Party from December 2018 to December 2019.

Early life and education
Na was born on December 6, 1963, in Seoul, South Korea. She graduated from Seoul National University with a bachelor's and a master's degree in law, and completed a doctoral program in international law at the same university.

Career
In 1995, Na became a judge for administrative courts of South Korea. She started her political career as a special aide for women's affairs to Lee Hoi-chang for the 2002 presidential election. She was one of two candidates of the October 2011 Seoul mayoral by-election after Oh Se-hoon resigned his position as mayor, but lost the election to Park Won-soon.

Na did not run in the 2012 legislative election due to allegations that her husband Kim Jae-ho was involved in a clandestine deal with a prosecutor from the Supreme Prosecutors' Office. She subsequently ran as a candidate for Dongjak B in a July 2014 by-election, and beat the Justice Party's Roh Hoe-chan by 929 votes.

Outside of politics, Na began working in sports in 2005. She became the president of Special Olympics Korea in 2005 and the Korean Wheelchair Rugby Association in 2006. In 2009, Na was selected to the Korean Paralympic Committee and elected vice president of the KPC in 2013. Also in 2013, Na was named onto the International Paralympic Committee and reelected in 2017.

In December 2018, Na was elected parliamentary floor leader of the main opposition party.,  the first woman in the country to hold this position. In February 2019, she warned that if the US could not get North Korea to denuclearize, Seoul would probably order more nuclear weaponry to level up to its northern counterpart.

She lost her Dongjak B seat to Lee Soo-jin in the 2020 legislative election. On 13 January 2021, she announced to run for Seoul Mayor in 2021 South Korean by-elections but lost to Oh Se-hoon in primary election.

Controversies
On September 26, 2011, Na Kyung-won visited a facility related to the severely disabled and was criticized socially for taking off the clothes of a severely disabled teenager and bathing naked in front of reporters. Human rights groups for the disabled also criticized Na Kyung-won.

On 15 April 2019, during a protest, progressive college students occupied the office of Na Kyung-won.

In September 2019, it was reported by local media that Na's son had allegedly received preferential treatment while in high school after he was listed as the first author in a paper's research summary. The paper was subsequently presented at a medical engineering conference at Seoul National University. Na stated that she finds the allegations "regrettable" and that her son "conducted the experiments himself and wrote about it."

Personal life 
Na Kyung-won is married to judge Kim Jae-ho and they have a son and a daughter, who has Down syndrome.

References

External links 
  Official website
 
 

1963 births
Living people
People from Seoul
Female members of the National Assembly (South Korea)
Liberty Korea Party politicians
People Power Party (South Korea) politicians
21st-century South Korean women politicians
20th-century South Korean judges
21st-century South Korean judges
Seoul National University School of Law alumni
South Korean Roman Catholics
South Korean women judges
International Paralympic Committee members
Naju Na clan
20th-century women judges
21st-century women judges
21st-century South Korean lawyers
South Korean women lawyers